Riabokrys Oleksandr Mykhailovych (born June 1, 1952) is a current director of the documentary film department of the National Television Company of Ukraine, and laureate of the Vasyl Stus Prize.

Biography 
Born in 1952 in the mining city of Krasnoarmiysk into a surveying and bookkeeping family, he graduated from the Donetsk Polytechnic institute as an engineer of Industrial control systems, and from Saint Petersburg State University of Cinema and television as a director.

Films
The first of his works was a film about the haidamaka-movement.
Among another films are:
 Sandarmokh  
 Ukrainians from Kolyma
 academic Mykhailo Kravchuk Calvary 
 Man of Will (about Mykhailo Soroka) 
 The Miroslav Simchich war  
 Free Cossacks (the liberation movement in 1918-1922 in  Kholodny Yar) 
 Sergei Korolev"  
 Opening Sky (the development of aviation in Ukraine ) 
 The Great Game (about the Ukrainian scouts organisation, Plast)

References

1952 births
Living people
Recipients of the Vasyl Stus Prize